Viviane K. Namaste is a Canadian feminist professor at Concordia University in Montreal. Her research focuses on sexual health, HIV/AIDS prevention, and sex work.

Education and work
Namaste received a Bachelors of Arts from Carleton University in 1989, an MA in Sociology from York University, and a doctoral degree from Université du Québec à Montréal in Semiotics and Linguistics. She worked within ACT UP Paris. In 2001, she received the Outstanding Book Award from the Gustavus Myers Center for her book titled, Invisible Lives: The Erasure of Transsexual and Transgendered People. That same year, Namaste was also a director in the documentary Madame Lauraine's Transsexual Touch which deals with transsexual sex workers as well as sexual health and clientele.

Namaste became an associate professor and the Research Chair in HIV/AIDS and Sexual Health at Concordia University in Montreal, Quebec, Canada. In 2009, she received the "Canadian Award for Action on HIV/AIDS and Human Rights", awarded jointly by the HIV Legal Network and Human Rights Watch.

In 2013, she was called as an official intervenor in a hearing at the Supreme Court of Canada on whether the ban on solicitation, prohibition of brothels and criminality of making a living from prostitution violates the Charter of Rights.

The feminist journal, Hypatia, has called Namaste's work, "extremely important".

Bibliography

 2000 · Invisible Lives: The Erasure of Transsexual and Transgendered People
 2005 · Sex Change, Social Change: Reflections on Identity, Institutions, and Imperialism
 2005 · C'était du spectacle! L'histoire des artistes transsexuelles à Montréal, 1955–1985
 2012 · HIV Prevention and Bisexual Realities
 2015 · Oversight
 2017 · Imprimés interdits: La censure des journaux jaunes au Québec, 1955–1975
 2019 · Thinking Differently about HIV/AIDS: Contributions from Critical Social Science
 2019 · Savoirs créoles: Leçons du sida pour l'histoire de Montréal

References

Further reading

Living people
York University alumni
Canadian women sociologists
Gender studies academics
Canadian feminists
Canadian sociologists
Medical sociologists
HIV/AIDS activists
Canadian LGBT rights activists
Transgender rights activists
Université du Québec à Montréal alumni
Academic staff of Concordia University
Carleton University alumni
Canadian women non-fiction writers
Canadian non-fiction writers
Year of birth missing (living people)
Transgender studies academics